Alessandro Filarete (died 1608) was a Roman Catholic prelate who served as Bishop of Umbriatico (1592–1608).

Biography
On 12 Aug 1592, Alessandro Filarete was appointed during the papacy of Pope Clement VIII as Bishop of Umbriatico.
He served as Bishop of Umbriatico until his death in 1608.

While bishop, he was the principal co-consecrator of Marcello Lorenzi, Bishop of Strongoli (1600).

References

External links and additional sources
 (for Chronology of Bishops) 
 (for Chronology of Bishops) 

16th-century Italian Roman Catholic bishops
17th-century Italian Roman Catholic bishops
Bishops appointed by Pope Clement VIII
1608 deaths